Immersion into virtual reality (VR) is a perception of being physically present in a non-physical world. The perception is created by surrounding the user of the VR system in images, sound or other stimuli that provide an engrossing total environment.

Etymology
The name is a metaphoric use of the experience of submersion applied to representation, fiction or simulation. Immersion can also be defined as the state of consciousness where a "visitor" (Maurice Benayoun) or "immersant" (Char Davies)'s awareness of physical self is transformed by being surrounded in an artificial environment; used for describing partial or complete suspension of disbelief, enabling action or reaction to stimulations encountered in a virtual or artistic environment. The greater the suspension of disbelief, the greater the degree of presence achieved.

Types 
According to Ernest W. Adams, immersion can be separated into three main categories:

 Tactical immersion: Tactical immersion is experienced when performing tactile operations that involve skill. Players feel "in the zone" while perfecting actions that result in success.
 Strategic immersion: Strategic immersion is more cerebral, and is associated with mental challenge. Chess players experience strategic immersion when choosing a correct solution among a broad array of possibilities.
 Narrative immersion: Narrative immersion occurs when players become invested in a story, and is similar to what is experienced while reading a book or watching a movie.

Staffan Björk and Jussi Holopainen, in Patterns In Game Design, divide immersion into similar categories, but call them sensory-motoric immersion, cognitive immersion and emotional immersion, respectively. In addition to these, they add a new category: spatial immersion, which occurs when a player feels the simulated world is perceptually convincing. The player feels that he or she is really "there" and that a simulated world looks and feels "real".

Presence 

Presence, a term derived from the shortening of the original "telepresence", is a phenomenon enabling people to interact with and feel connected to the world outside their physical bodies via technology. It is defined as a person's subjective sensation of being there in a scene depicted by a medium, usually virtual in nature. Most designers focus on the technology used to create a high-fidelity virtual environment; however, the human factors involved in achieving a state of presence must be taken into account as well. It is the subjective perception, although generated by and/or filtered through human-made technology, that ultimately determines the successful attainment of presence.

Virtual reality glasses can produce a visceral feeling of being in a simulated world, a form of spatial immersion called Presence. According to Oculus VR, the technology requirements to achieve this visceral reaction are low-latency and precise tracking of movements.

Michael Abrash gave a talk on VR at Steam Dev Days in 2014. According to the VR research team at Valve, all of the following are needed to establish presence.

 A wide field of view (80 degrees or better)
 Adequate resolution (1080p or better)
 Low pixel persistence (3 ms or less)
 A high enough refresh rate (>60 Hz, 95 Hz is enough but less may be adequate)
 Global display where all pixels are illuminated simultaneously (rolling display may work with eye tracking.)
 Optics (at most two lenses per eye with trade-offs, ideal optics not practical using current technology)
 Optical calibration
 Rock-solid tracking – translation with millimeter accuracy or better, orientation with quarter degree accuracy or better, and volume of 1.5 meter or more on a side
 Low latency (20 ms motion to last photon, 25 ms may be good enough)

Immersive media and technology

Immersive media is a term applied to a group of concepts, variously defined, which may have application in fields such as engineering, media, healthcare, education and retail. Concepts included in immersive media are:
 Virtual reality (VR)
 Augmented reality (AR)
 Mixed reality (MR)
 3D content

Technology 

Immersive virtual reality is a technology that aims to completely immerse the user inside the computer generated world, giving the impression to the user that they have "stepped inside" the synthetic world. This is achieved by either using the technologies of Head-Mounted Display(HMD) or multiple projections. HMD allows VR to be projected right in front of the eyes and allows users to focus on it without any distraction. The earliest attempts at developing immersive technology date back to the 1800s. Without these early attempts, the world of immersive technology would never have reached its advanced technological state we have today. The many elements that surround the realm of immersive technology all come together in different ways to create different types of immersive technology including virtual reality and pervasive gaming. While immersive technology has already had an immense impact on our world, its progressive growth and development will continue to make lasting impacts among our technological culture.

Origin
One of the first devices that was designed to look like and function as a virtual reality headset was called a stereoscope. It was invented in the 1830s during the early days of photography, and it used a slightly different image in each eye to create a kind of 3D effect. Although as photography continued to develop in the late 1800s, stereoscopes became more and more obsolete. Immersive technology became more available to the people in 1957 when Morton Heilig invented the Sensorama cinematic experience that included speakers, fans, smell generators, and a vibrating chair to immerse the viewer in the movie. When one imagines the VR headsets they see today, they must give credit to The Sword of Damocles which was invented in 1968 and allowed users to connect their VR headsets to a computer rather than a camera. In 1991, Sega launched the Sega VR headset which was made for arcade/home use, but only the arcade version was released due to technical difficulties. Augmented reality began to rapidly develop within the 1990s when Louis Rosenberg created Virtual Fixtures, which was the first fully immersive augmented reality system, used for the Air Force. The invention enhanced operator performance of manual tasks in remote locations by using two robot controls in an exoskeleton. The first introduction of augmented reality displayed to a live audience was in 1998, when the NFL first displayed a virtual yellow line to represent the line of scrimmage/first down. In 1999, Hirokazu Kato developed the ARToolkit, which was an open source library for the development of AR applications. This allowed people to experiment with AR and release new and improved applications. Later, in 2009 Esquire's magazine was the first to use a QR code on the front of their magazine to provide additional content. Once The Oculus came out in 2012, it revolutionized virtual reality and eventually raised 2.4 million dollars and began releasing their pre-production models to developers. Facebook purchased Oculus for 2 billion dollars in 2014, which showed the world the upward trajectory of VR. In 2013, Google announced their plans to develop their first AR headset, Google Glass. The production stopped in 2015 due to privacy concerns, but relaunched in 2017 exclusively for the enterprise. In 2016, Pokémon Go took the world by storm and became one of the most downloaded apps of all time. It was the first augmented reality game that was accessible through ones phone.

Elements of immersive technology

A full immersive technology experience happens when all elements of sight, sound, and touch come together. A true immersive experience needs to be done with either virtual reality or augmented reality, as these two types utilize all of these elements. Interactivity and connectivity is the entire focus of immersive technology. It is not placing someone in an entirely different environment, it is when they are virtually presented with a new environment and are given the opportunity to learn how to optimally live and interact with it.

Types of immersive technology 
Virtual reality is the primary source of immersive technology that allows the user to be completely immersed in a fully digital environment that replicates another reality. Users must use a headset, hand controls, and headphones in order to have a fully immersive experience where one is able to utilize movements/reflects. There are also pervasive games which utilize real world locations within game play. This is when the user's interaction on a virtual game lead to them interacting in real life. Some of these games may require users to physically meet up in order to complete stages. The gaming world has developed a series of popular virtual reality videogames, such asVader Immortal, Trover Saves the Universe, and No Man's Sky. The world of immersive technology has many facets that will continue to develop/expand over time.

Immersive technology today
Immersive technology has grown immensely in the past few decades, and is continuing to progress. VR has even been described as the learning aid of the 21st century. Head mounted displays(HMD) is what allows users to get the full immersive experience. The HMD market is expected to be worth over 25 billion USD by the year 2022. The technologies of VR and AR received a boost in attention when Mark Zuckerberg, founder/creator of Facebook, bought Oculus for 2 billion USD in 2014. Recently, the Oculus quest was released, which is wireless and allows users to move more freely. It costs around 400 USD which is around the same price as the previous generation headsets with cables. Other massive corporations such as, Sony, Samsung, HTC are also making huge investments into VR/AR. In regards to education, there are currently many researchers who are exploring the benefits and applications of virtual reality in the classroom. However, there is little systemic work that currently exists regarding how researchers have applied immersive VR for higher education purposes using HMD's. The most popular use of immersive technology comes in the world of videogames. Completely immersing users into their favorite game, HMD's have allowed individuals to experience the realm of videogames in an entirely new light. Current videogames such as Star Wars: Squadron, Half-Life: Alyx, and No Man's Sky are giving users the ability to experience every aspect of the digital world in their game. While there is still a lot to learn about immersive technology and what it has to offer, it has come an entirely long way from its beginning on the early 1800s.

Components

Perception 
Hardware technologies are developed to stimulate one or more of the senses to create perceptually real sensations. Some vision technologies are 3D displays, fulldomes, head-mounted displays, and holography. Some auditory technologies are 3D audio effects, high-resolution audio, and surround sound. Haptic technology simulates tactile responses.

Interaction 
Various technologies provide the ability to interact and communicate with the virtual environment, including brain-computer interfaces, gesture recognition, omnidirectional treadmills, and speech recognition.

Software 
Software interacts with the hardware technology to render the virtual environment and process the user input to provide dynamic, real-time response. To achieve this, software often integrates components of artificial intelligence and virtual worlds. This is done differently depending on the technology and environment; Whether the software needs to create a fully immersive environment or display a projection on the already existing environment the user is looking at.

Research and development
Many universities have programs that research and develop immersive technology. Examples are Stanford's Virtual Human Interaction Lab, USC's Computer Graphics and Immersive Technologies Lab, Iowa State Virtual Reality Applications Center, University of Buffalo's VR Lab, Teesside University's Intelligent Virtual Environments Lab, Liverpool John Moores University's Immersive Story Lab, University of Michigan Ann Arbor, Oklahoma State University and the University of Southern California. All of these universities and more are researching the advancement of the technology along with the different uses that VR could be applied to.

As well universities the video game industry has received a massive boost from immersive technology specifically Augmented reality. The company Epic games known for their popular game Fortnite generated 1.25 billion dollars in a round of investing in 2018 as they have a leading 3D development platform for AR apps. The U.S. Government requests information for immersive technology development and funds specific projects. This is for implementation in government branches in the future.

Application

Immersive technology is applied in several areas, including retail and e-commerce, the adult industry, art, entertainment and video games and interactive storytelling, military, education, and medicine.  It is also growing in the Non-profit industry in fields such as disaster relief and conservation due to its ability to put a user in a situation that would elicit more of a real-world experience than just a picture giving them a stronger emotional connection to the situation they would be viewing. As immersive technology becomes more mainstream, it will likely pervade other industries. Also with the legalization of cannabis happening worldwide, the cannabis industry has seen a large growth in the immersive technology market to allow virtual tours of their facilities to engage potential customers and investors.

Concerns and ethics
The potential perils of immersive technology have often been portrayed in science fiction and entertainment. Movies such as eXistenZ, The Matrix, and the short film Play by David Kaplan and Eric Zimmerman, raise questions about what may happen if we are unable to distinguish the physical world from the digital world. As the world of immersive technology becomes deeper and more intense this will be a growing concern for consumers and governments alike as to how to regulate this industry. Because all these technology is immersive and therefore not taking place in real life the application and or problems that come with the developing industry are something to keep an eye on. For example, Legal systems debate on topics of virtual crime, and whether it is ethical to permit illegal behavior such as rape in a simulated environment, this is relative to the adult industry, art, entertainment and video games industries.

Immersive virtual reality 

Immersive virtual reality is a hypothetical future technology that exists today as virtual reality art projects, for the most part. It consists of immersion in an artificial environment where the user feels just as immersed as they usually feel in everyday life.

Direct interaction of the nervous system 
The most considered method would be to induce the sensations that made up the virtual reality in the nervous system directly. In functionalism/conventional biology we interact with everyday life through the nervous system. Thus we receive all input from all the senses as nerve impulses. It gives your neurons a feeling of heightened sensation. It would involve the user receiving inputs as artificially stimulated nerve impulses, the system would receive the CNS outputs (natural nerve impulses) and process them allowing the user to interact with the virtual reality. Natural impulses between the body and central nervous system would need to be prevented. This could be done by blocking out natural impulses using nanorobots which attach themselves to the brain wiring, whilst receiving the digital impulses of which describe the virtual world, which could then be sent into the wiring of the brain. A feedback system between the user and the computer which stores the information would also be needed. Considering how much information would be required for such a system, it is likely that it would be based on hypothetical forms of computer technology.

Requirements 
Understanding of the nervous system
A comprehensive understanding of which nerve impulses correspond to which sensations, and which motor impulses correspond to which muscle contractions will be required. This will allow the correct sensations in the user, and actions in the virtual reality to occur. The Blue Brain Project is the current, most promising research with the idea of understanding how the brain works by building very large scale computer models.

Ability to manipulate CNS

The central nervous system would obviously need to be manipulated. Whilst non-invasive devices using radiation have been postulated, invasive cybernetic implants are likely to become available sooner and be more accurate. 
Molecular nanotechnology is likely to provide the degree of precision required and could allow the implant to be built inside the body rather than be inserted by an operation.

Computer hardware/software to process inputs/outputs
A very powerful computer would be necessary for processing virtual reality complex enough to be nearly indistinguishable from everyday life and interacting with central nervous system fast enough.

Immersive digital environments 

An immersive digital environment is an artificial, interactive, computer-created scene or "world" within which a user can immerse themselves.

Immersive digital environments could be thought of as synonymous with virtual reality, but without the implication that actual "reality" is being simulated. An immersive digital environment could be a model of reality, but it could also be a complete fantasy user interface or abstraction, as long as the user of the environment is immersed within it. The definition of immersion is wide and variable, but here it is assumed to mean simply that the user feels like they are part of the simulated "universe". The success with which an immersive digital environment can actually immerse the user is dependent on many factors such as believable 3D computer graphics, surround sound, interactive user-input and other factors such as simplicity, functionality and potential for enjoyment. New technologies are currently under development which claim to bring realistic environmental effects to the players' environment – effects like wind, seat vibration and ambient lighting.

Perception 
To create a sense of full immersion, the 5 senses (sight, sound, touch, smell, taste) must perceive the digital environment to be physically real. Immersive technology can perceptually fool the senses through:
 Panoramic 3D displays (visual)
 Surround sound acoustics (auditory)
 Haptics and force feedback (tactile)
 Smell replication (olfactory)
 Taste replication (gustation)

Interaction 
Once the senses reach a sufficient belief that the digital environment is real (it is interaction and involvement which can never be real), the user must then be able to interact with the environment in a natural, intuitive manner.  Various immersive technologies such as gestural controls, motion tracking, and computer vision respond to the user's actions and movements.  Brain control interfaces (BCI) respond to the user's brainwave activity.

Examples and applications 
Training and rehearsal simulations run the gamut from part task procedural training (often buttonology, for example:  which button do you push to deploy a refueling boom) through situational simulation (such as crisis response or convoy driver training) to full motion simulations which train pilots or soldiers and law enforcement in scenarios that are too dangerous to train in actual equipment using live ordinance.

Video games from simple arcade to massively multiplayer online game and training programs such as flight and driving simulators. Entertainment environments such as motion simulators that immerse the riders/players in a virtual digital environment enhanced by motion, visual and aural cues. Reality simulators, such as one of the Virunga Mountains in Rwanda that takes you on a trip through the jungle to meet a tribe of mountain gorillas. Or training versions such as one which simulates taking a ride through human arteries and the heart to witness the buildup of plaque and thus learn about cholesterol and health.

In parallel with scientists, artists like Knowbotic Research, Donna Cox, Rebecca Allen, Robbie Cooper, Maurice Benayoun, Char Davies, and Jeffrey Shaw use the potential of immersive virtual reality to create physiologic or symbolic experiences and situations.

Other examples of immersion technology include physical environment / immersive space with surrounding digital projections and sound such as the CAVE, and the use of virtual reality headsets for viewing movies, with head-tracking and computer control of the image presented, so that the viewer appears to be inside the scene. The next generation is VIRTSIM, which achieves total immersion through motion capture and wireless head mounted displays for teams of up to thirteen immersants enabling natural movement through space and interaction in both the virtual and physical space simultaneously.

Use in medical care 

New fields of studies linked to immersive virtual reality emerge every day. Researchers see a great potential in virtual reality tests serving as complementary interview methods in psychiatric care.
Immersive virtual reality have in studies also been used as an educational tool in which the visualization of psychotic states have been used to get increased understanding of patients with similar symptoms. New treatment methods are available for schizophrenia and other newly developed research areas where immersive virtual reality is expected to achieve melioration is in education of surgical procedures, rehabilitation program from injuries and surgeries and reduction of phantom limb pain.

Applications in the built environment 
In the domain of architectural design and building science, immersive virtual environments are adopted to facilitate architects and building engineers to enhance the design process through assimilating their sense of scale, depth, and spatial awareness. Such platforms integrate the use of virtual reality models and mixed reality technologies in various functions of building science research, construction operations, personnel training, end-user surveys, performance simulations and building information modeling visualization. Head-mounted displays (with both 3 degrees of freedom and 6 degrees of freedom systems) and CAVE platforms are used for spatial visualization and building information modeling (BIM) navigations for different design and evaluation purposes. Clients, architects and building owners use derived applications from game engines to navigate 1:1 scale BIM models, allowing a virtual walkthrough experience of future buildings. For such use cases, the performance improvement of space navigation between virtual reality headsets and 2D desktop screens has been investigated in various studies, with some suggesting significant improvement in virtual reality headsets while others indicate no significant difference. Architects and building engineers can also use immersive design tools to model various building elements in virtual reality CAD interfaces, and apply property modifications to building information modeling (BIM) files through such environments.

In the building construction phase, immersive environments are used to improve site preparations, on site communication and collaboration of team members, safety and logistics. For training of construction workers, virtual environments have shown to be highly effective in skill transfer with studies showing similar performance results to training in real environments. Moreover, virtual platforms are also used in the operation phase of buildings to interact and visualize data with Internet of Things (IoT) devices available in buildings, process improvement and also resource management.

Occupant and end-user studies are performed through immersive environments. Virtual immersive platforms engage future occupants in the building design process by providing a sense of presence to users with integrating pre-construction mock-ups and BIM models for the evaluation of alternative design options in the building model in a timely and cost efficient manner. Studies conducting human experiments have shown users perform similarly in daily office activities (object identification, reading speed and comprehension) within immersive virtual environments and benchmarked physical environments. In the field of lighting, virtual reality headsets have been used investigate the influence of façade patterns on the perceptual impressions and satisfaction of a simulated daylit space. Moreover, artificial lighting studies have implemented immersive virtual environments to evaluate end-users lighting preferences of simulated virtual scenes with the controlling of the blinds and artificial lights in the virtual environment.

For structural engineering and analysis, immersive environments enable the user to focus on structural investigations without getting too distracted to operate and navigate the simulation tool. Virtual and augmented reality applications have been designed for finite element analysis of shell structures. Using stylus and data gloves as input devices, the user can create, modify mesh, and specify boundary conditions. For a simple geometry, real-time color-coded results are obtained by changing loads on the model. Studies have used artificial neural networks (ANN) or approximation methods to achieve real-time interaction for the complex geometry, and to simulate its impact via haptic gloves. Large scale structures and bridge simulation have also been achieved in immersive virtual environments. The user can move the loads acting on the bridge, and finite element analysis results are updated immediately using an approximate module.

Detrimental effects 

Simulation sickness, or simulator sickness, is a condition where a person exhibits symptoms similar to motion sickness caused by playing computer/simulation/video games (Oculus Rift is working to solve simulator sickness).

Motion sickness due to virtual reality is very similar to simulation sickness and motion sickness due to films. In virtual reality, however, the effect is made more acute as all external reference points are blocked from vision, the simulated images are three-dimensional and in some cases stereo sound that may also give a sense of motion. Studies have shown that exposure to rotational motions in a virtual environment can cause significant increases in nausea and other symptoms of motion sickness.

Other behavioural changes such as stress, addiction, isolation and mood changes are also discussed to be side-effects caused by immersive virtual reality.

See also

 Alternate reality game
 Environmental sculpture
 Fisheye lens
 Interactive art
 Narrative transportation
 MSG Sphere
 Neo-conceptual art
 Oculus
 70mm film
 Simulated reality
 Sound art
 Sound installation
 Super Panavision 70
 Douglas Trumbull
 Video installation
 Virtual art
 Volumetric video

References

Further reading 

 media.ford.com
 on.aol.com
 Reyes, Stephanie. "Ford brings virtual reality presentation to UCF.", September 2012.
 Christiane Paul, Digital Art, Thames & Hudson Ltd.
 Oliver Grau, "Virtual Art: From Illusion to Immersion" MIT-Press, Cambridge 2003
 Timothy Murray, Derrick de Kerckhove, Oliver Grau, Kristine Stiles, Jean-Baptiste Barrière, Dominique Moulon, Maurice Benayoun Open Art, Nouvelles éditions Scala, 2011, French version, 
 Allen Varney, (August 8, 2006). "Immersion Unexplained" in "The Escapist"
 Frank Popper, "From Technological to Virtual Art", MIT Press. .
 Oliver Grau (Ed.), Media Art Histories, MIT-Press, Cambridge 2007
 Joseph Nechvatal, "Immersive Excess in the Apse of Lascaux", Technonoetic Arts 3, no3. 2005
 
 
 Edward A. Shanken, Art and Electronic Media. London: Phaidon, 2009. 
 Joseph Nechvatal Towards an Immersive Intelligence: Essays on the Work of Art in the Age of Computer Technology and Virtual Reality  (1993–2006). Edgewise Press. New York, N.Y. 2009
 Joseph Nechvatal, Immersive Ideals / Critical Distances. LAP Lambert Academic Publishing. 2009

External links

Annual Summit on Immersive Technology
 pdf download of Joseph Nechvatal's text book: Immersive Ideals / Critical Distances. LAP Lambert Academic Publishing. 2009
Audio and Game Immersion PhD thesis about game audio (the IEZA Framework) and immersion.
 Immersive Education Initiative
 Immersive Design Conference
 International Symposium on Mixed and Augmented Reality (ISMAR) 
 Immersive Infotech
 Immersive Learning Research Network
 

Virtual reality
Game terminology
Visual arts genres
Contemporary art
Emerging technologies
Technology assessments
New media
New media art
American art
Conceptual art
Sound
Articles containing video clips